Libra Scale is the fourth studio album by American singer-songwriter Ne-Yo. It was released on October 27, 2010 in Japan, followed by a release in the United Kingdom on October 29, as well as a release in the United States on November 22, 2010 by Def Jam Recordings and Compound Entertainment. The album was preceded by three singles: its lead Europop-oriented single, and the UK number-one hit "Beautiful Monster", as well the R&B singles "Champagne Life" and "One in a Million".

Upon release, Libra Scale received favorable reviews from most music critics. The album opened at number 9 on the US Billboard 200, selling 112,000 copies in its first week sales, becoming his fourth consecutive top-ten album in the United States following Year of the Gentleman in 2008. It currently holds a 73 out of 100 on Metacritic, which indicates "generally favorable reviews", based on fourteen reviews, and has attained three singles that have achieved moderate Billboard chart success.

Background and concept
According to Ne-Yo, the idea for the album emerged from three influences: his desire to do something different instead of a standard compilation; his interest in science fiction, comic books and Japanese animation; and inspiration from the works of Michael Jackson, particularly Thriller, Moonwalker, and Bad. Originally a short movie was to accompany the album, but such proved not to be viable given time and monetary constraints, so Ne-Yo chose to develop a series of six extended music videos instead. Nevertheless, the film concept continues to influence the work, as he has stated the songs on the album are inspired by the script of the film that he wrote. The album features a number of songs which follow the story of Jerome and Pretti Sinclair.

The album's title is a reference to Libra, Ne-Yo's astrological sign.

The album's concept explores a story questioning morality and both sides of the Libra Scale: the decision between money/power/fame versus love. The story follows three garbage men – Jerome, Clyde and Leroy – who are offered everything they have wanted in return for protecting the city against a forthcoming threat. However, there's a catch: they can never fall in love. When Jerome (Ne-Yo) falls for Pretti Sinclair (Galen Hooks) disaster ensues, and he has to choose between his love for her and the fame, power and money that he had been given, as he must choose between her life and his own.

Singles

"Beautiful Monster"  was released as the lead single on June 8, 2010. It peaked at fifty-three on the US Billboard Hot 100 and sixty-one on the US Hot R&B/Hip-Hop Songs chart. It performed the best in the UK, where it became his third number-one hit. It also reached the top ten in Japan and Ireland, and achieved moderate success in other international markets. "Champagne Life" was released as the second North American single on July 20, 2010. It peaked at seventy-five on the Billboard Hot 100, eleven on the Hot R&B/Hip-Hop Songs chart, and due to gaining strong digital sales, reached the top forty in Japan. "One in a Million" was released as the third North American and second international single on September 7, 2010. It peaked at eighty-seven on the US Billboard Hot 100 and reached a peak of twenty-one on the US Hot R&B/Hip-Hop Songs chart. It also reached the top twenty in the UK and charted in Australia.

Reception

Commercial performance
The album debuted at number 9 on the Billboard 200 chart, with first-week sales of 112,000 copies in the United States.

Critical response

Upon its release, Libra Scale received generally favorable reviews from most music critics. At Metacritic, which assigns a normalized rating out of 100 to reviews from mainstream critics, the album received an average score of 73, based on 14 reviews, which indicates "generally favorable reviews". Jody Rosen of Rolling Stone awarded the album with four stars out of five, commenting that "the real concept here is: Michael Jackson tribute album. And a damn good one." Andy Kellman of Allmusic gave the album three and a half out of five stars, stating that "Ne-Yo remains a premier source of R&B that is both traditional and contemporary." Todd Martens of Los Angeles Times gave the album two and a half out of four stars, commenting that "Ultimately it's admirable that Ne-Yo felt the need to take listeners on a out-of-this-world ride, but he's at his best when sticking closer to home." Elysa Gardner of USA Today gave the album a score of three stars out of four and said, "This electro-savvy song cycle, involving a squad of superheroes and a love interest with a femme fatale alter ego, may not boast Ne-Yo's strongest hooks to date. But Libra Scales [sic] does confirm his affinity for balancing old-school romance with a youthful, fluid sensuality."

Track listing

Notes
 signifies an additional producer

Personnel
Credits for Libra Scale adapted from Allmusic and album
's liner notes.

 Chris Atlas – marketing
 Leesa D. Brunson – A&R coordination
 Erik "Baby Jesus" Coomes – bass (track 5)
 Tyler "Tycoon" Coomes – additional drums (track 5)
 Tom Coyne – mastering
 Kevin "KD" Davis – mixing (tracks 1, 6, 8, 10)
 Mikkel S. Eriksen – producer, engineer, and instrumentation (track 9)
 Fabolous - rap (track 5)
 Tishawn "Go2Man" Gayle – management
 D. Dorohn Gough – producer (tracks 1, 10)
 Jaymz Hardy-Martin III – engineer (tracks 1-8, 10), mixing (tracks 2-7)
 Chuck Harmony – producer (track 6)
 Reynell "Tango" Hay – management
 Tor Erik Hermansen – producer and instrumentation (track 9)
 Rochad Holiday – producer, keyboards, and drum programming (track 3)
 Josh Houghkirk – mix assistant (track 9)
 Jackpot – producer (track 8)
 Q. Nicole Jackson – A&R coordination
 Mike "TrakGuru" Johnson – engineer (track 6)
 Rachel Johnson – stylist
 Sixx Johnson – producer, keyboards, and drum programming (track 3)
 Terese Joseph – A&R administration
 Doug Joswick – package production
 Jerel Lake – assistant mix engineer (tracks 1, 6, 8, 10)
 Ryan Leslie – producer (track 5)
 Damien Lewis – additional engineering (track 9)
 Ne-Yo – vocals (all tracks), executive producer
 Carlos Oyanedel – additional engineering (track 9)
 Brent Paschke – guitar (track 5)
 Will Ragland – art direction and design
 Antonio "L.A." Reid – executive producer
 Anthony Reyes – bass and guitar (track 4)
 Syience – producer (track 7)
 Phil Tan – mixing (track 9)
 Dwayne Thomas, Jr. – additional bass guitar (track 2)
 Sandy Vee – producer, mixing, and instrumentation (track 9)
 Sacha Waldman – photography
 Derrick White – producer (track 2)
 Curtis "Sauce" Wilson – additional production and additional keyboards (track 3)
 Jesse "Corparal"  Wilson – producer, music, and programming (track 4)
 Kristen Yiengst – art and photography coordination

Charts

Weekly charts

Year-end charts

Certifications

Release history

References

Def Jam Recordings albums
Ne-Yo albums
Albums produced by Chuck Harmony
Albums produced by Ne-Yo
Albums produced by Stargate
Albums produced by Ryan Leslie
2010 albums
Concept albums